Hypsideroides junodi is a species of beetle in the family Cerambycidae, and the only species in the genus Hypsideroides. It was described by Karl Jordan in 1906.

References

Pachystolini
Beetles described in 1906
Taxa named by Karl Jordan